Liam Anthony Naughten (30 May 1944 – 16 November 1996) was an Irish Fine Gael politician.

Career 
Naughten served as Cathaoirleach of Seanad Éireann from 1995 to 1996. He was a Senator for the Agricultural Panel from 1977 to 1982 and 1989 to 1996. He served as a Teachta Dála (TD) for the Roscommon constituency from 1982 to 1989.

A farmer, he first contested the 1977 general election for the Roscommon–Leitrim constituency, but he was not elected. He was again unsuccessful at the 1981 general election, but was elected to the 15th Seanad for the Agricultural Panel.

He was finally elected to Dáil Éireann at the February 1982 general election for the Roscommon constituency and held his seat until losing it at the 1989 general election to Fine Gael running-mate John Connor. He was again elected to the Seanad and retained this seat after again failing to be elected for Longford–Roscommon at the 1992 general election.

In 1995, when Fine Gael formed a Government, Naughten became Cathaoirleach of the Seanad.

Personal life 
His son Denis Naughten, aged 24, was elected in a by-election to fill his Seanad seat and was elected to the Dáil in the 1997 general election.

Death 
Naughten died in a traffic accident in November 1996.

See also
 Families in the Oireachtas

References

1944 births
1996 deaths
Cathaoirligh of Seanad Éireann
Local councillors in County Roscommon
Fine Gael TDs
Members of the 15th Seanad
Members of the 19th Seanad
Members of the 20th Seanad
Members of the 23rd Dáil
Members of the 24th Dáil
Members of the 25th Dáil
Irish farmers
Fine Gael senators